Spelaeophryne methneri is a species of frog in the family Brevicipitidae. It is the only species in the monotypic genus Spelaeophryne.
It is found in Tanzania and possibly Malawi.
Its natural habitats are subtropical or tropical moist lowland forest, subtropical or tropical moist montane forest, and moist savanna.

References

Brevicipitidae
Amphibians described in 1924
Taxa named by Ernst Ahl
Monotypic amphibian genera
Taxonomy articles created by Polbot